Mervyn John King (born 4 January 1966, in King's Lynn) is an international lawn and indoor bowler from Fakenham.

Bowls career
King has represented England at three Commonwealth Games, the 2002, 2006 and the 2010 Commonwealth Games where he won a silver medal, with Stuart Airey, in the men's pairs competition. 

He has also won two bronze medals at the 2004 World Outdoor Bowls Championship in Ayr in the triples and fours events.

He is a leading player on the indoor circuit and has remained in the world's top sixteen since 2006 and has won the world singles indoor title in 2006 and is also three times world indoor pairs champion in 1997 with Tony Allcock and twice with Kelvin Kerkow in 2005 and 2009. Other major wins include 2009 World Matchplay and 2010 Scottish International Open.

Personal life
He is a pest controller by trade and is married with three children and two step children.

References

External links
 World Bowls Tour : Mervyn King

Living people
1966 births
Bowls players at the 2002 Commonwealth Games
Bowls players at the 2006 Commonwealth Games
Bowls players at the 2010 Commonwealth Games
Commonwealth Games silver medallists for England
English male bowls players
Sportspeople from King's Lynn
People from Fakenham
Indoor Bowls World Champions
Commonwealth Games medallists in lawn bowls
Medallists at the 2010 Commonwealth Games